Jose Ricardo Figueroa (born 10 January 1991) is a Cuban modern pentathlete. He competed at the 2016 Summer Olympics in Rio de Janeiro, in the men's event.

References

External links

1991 births
Living people
Cuban male modern pentathletes
Olympic modern pentathletes of Cuba
Modern pentathletes at the 2016 Summer Olympics
Modern pentathletes at the 2015 Pan American Games
Modern pentathletes at the 2019 Pan American Games
Pan American Games medalists in modern pentathlon
Pan American Games silver medalists for Cuba
Medalists at the 2019 Pan American Games
20th-century Cuban people
21st-century Cuban people